Panchanathan Arunachalam (22 March 1941 – 9 August 2016) was an Indian writer, director, producer and lyricist who worked in Tamil cinema. He was mentored by poet Kannadasan who was his uncle. He also worked as a lyricist in the Tamil cinema industry. He started producing films under his production banner named P. A. Arts. His son Subbu Panchu Arunachalam is an actor and dubbing artist in the Tamil film industry.

Career
In 2004, Panchu Arunachalam opted to return to work as a director and planned a film titled Ganesha with Cheran in the lead role. However, the film eventually did not materialise.

Filmography

As director
 Manamagale Vaa (1988)
 Puthu Paatu (1990)
 Thambi Pondatti (1992)
 Kalikaalam (1992)

As producer
 Avar Enakke Sontham (1977)
 Kavari Maan (1979) [Co-Producer]
 Kalyanaraman (1979)
 Aarilirunthu Arubathu Varai (1979)
 Rusi Kanda Poonai (1980)
 Kazhugu (1981)
 Ellam Inba Mayyam (1981)
 Anandha Ragam (1982)
 Magane Magane (1982)
 Enkeyo Ketta Kural (1982)
 Veetula Raman Veliyila Krishnan (1983)
 Kuva Kuva Vaathugal (1984)
 Thambikku Entha Ooru (1984)
 Japanil Kalyanaraman (1985)
 Guru Sishyan (1988)
 En Jeevan Paduthu (1988)
 Michael Madhana Kamarajan (1990)
 Raasukutti (1992)
 Thambi Pondatti (1992)
 Enga Muthalali (1993)
Vanaja Girija (1994)
 Veera (1994)
 Mayabazar (1995)
 Alexander (1996)
 Poovellam Kettuppar (1999)
 Rishi (2001)
 Solla Marandha Kadhai (2002)
Mayakannadi (2007)

As writer

 Chanakya (2005)
Unnai Paartha Naal Mudhal (2003) (dialogues)
 Rishi (2001)
Alexander (1996)
 Mayabazar (1995)
 Thottil Kuzhandhai (1995)
Vanaja Girija (1994)
Veera (1994)
 Singaravelan (1992)
Pandiyan (1992)
 Halli Rambhe Belli Bombe (1991)- Kannada
Dharma Durai (1991)
Enkitta Mothathe (1990)
Athisaya Piravi (1990)
Mappillai (1989)
Raja Chinna Roja (1989)
Apoorva Sagodharargal (1989)
Rajadhi Raja (1989)
Dharmathin Thalaivan (1988)
En Jeevan Paduthu (1988)
Manamagale Vaa (1988)
Guru Sishyan (1988)
Manithan (1987)
Paruva Ragam (1987) (dialogues)
Ullam Kavarndha Kalvan (1987)
Japanil Kalyanaraman (1985)
Puthiya Theerppu (1985)
Uyarndha Ullam (1985)
Nalla Thambi (1985)
Thambikku Entha Ooru (1984)
Vaazhkai (1984)
Kuva Kuva Vaathugal (1984)
Thoongadhey Thambi Thoongadhey (1983)
Mann Vasanai (1983) [Dialogue]
Adutha Varisu (1983)
Salangai Oli (1983) (dialogues)
Paayum Puli (1983)
Sakalakala Vallavan (1982)
Enkeyo Ketta Kural (1982)
Magane Magane (1982)
Pokkiri Raja (1982)
Anandha Ragam (1982)
Ellam Inba Mayyam (1981)
Kadal Meengal (1981)
Kazhugu (1981)
Rusi Kanda Poonai (1980)
Murattu Kaalai (1980)
Ullasa Paravaigal (1980)
Aarilirunthu Arubathu Varai (1979)
Kalyanaraman (1979)
Kavari Maan (1979)
Niram Maaratha Pookkal (1979)
 Vetrikku Oruvan (1979)
Priya (1978)
Sakka Podu Podu Raja (1978)
Vattathukkul Chaduram (1978)
Ithu Eppadi Irukku (1978)
Kaatrinile Varum Geetham (1978)
Gaayathri (1977)
Bhuvana Oru Kelvi Kuri (1977)
Kavikkuyil (1977)
Avar Enakke Sontham (1977)
Annakili (1976)
Thunive Thunai (1976)
Uravu Solla Oruvan (1975)
Mayangukiral Oru Maadhu (1975)
Thottadhellam Ponnaagum (1975)
Avanthan Manithan (1975) [Dialogue]
 Engamma Sapatham (1974)
 Ungal Viruppam (1974)
 Kalyanamam Kalyanam (1974)
 Hello Partner (1972)
 Thiruneelakandar (1972) [Co-Written with Kannadasan]

As lyricist

Awards

 Won, 1982 - Tamil Nadu State Film Award for Best Dialogue Writer for Engeyo Ketta Kural
 Won, 2016 - SIIMA Lifetime Achievement Award

References

1941 births
2016 deaths
Film directors from Tamil Nadu
Tamil film directors
Tamil screenwriters
Tamil film producers
Tamil film poets
Screenwriters from Tamil Nadu
Indian lyricists
20th-century Indian film directors
20th-century Indian dramatists and playwrights
21st-century Indian dramatists and playwrights
South Indian International Movie Awards winners